National Unity Party of the Tribes of Afghanistan is a political party in Afghanistan, led by Nasrullah Barakzai.

References

Political parties in Afghanistan